Vrtoče is a dispersed settlement south of Bilje in the Municipality of Miren-Kostanjevica in the Littoral region of Slovenia.

References

External links
Vrtoče on Geopedia

Populated places in the Municipality of Miren-Kostanjevica